Act of Love is a 1980 American made-for-television film adaptation of the book Act of Love: The Killing of George Zygmanik by Judith Paige Mitchell. It is based on a true story.

It was directed by Jud Taylor and written for screen by Michael De Guzman.  It stars Ron Howard,  Robert Foxworth, Mickey Rourke, David Spielberg and Jacqueline Brookes. Film also features Married... with Children star David Faustino.  The score was composed by Billy Goldenberg.

The story concerns a man performing euthanasia on his paralyzed brother.

It was the sixth most-watched prime time television program in the United States for the week of its debut in September 1980.

References

External links 
 

1980 television films
1980 films
1980s English-language films
1980 romantic drama films
Films directed by Jud Taylor
Films scored by Billy Goldenberg
American romantic drama films
Films about euthanasia
American drama television films
1980s American films